Milkaylovka (Russian: Михайловка, Bashkir: Михайловка) — is a village in the Ufimsky district, related with Mikhaylovski selsovyet.

Population 
 National composition
According to the 2002 Russian Census, the main ethnicities present in the village are Russians (48%) and Tatars (33%).

Geography 
Mikhaylovka is 12 km (7.46 miles) away from the nearest administrative centre and train station in Ufa.

Notable residents 
 Alexey Mikhaylovich Alymov the Hero of the Soviet Union was the principal and a teacher in the Mikhaylovka High School.
 The Russian biathlonist and three-time world champion Maxim Tchoudov was born in Mikhaylovka.
 Maxim Tchoudov's first trainer Kovalev Valery Vasilyevich lives in Mikhaylovka.

References 

Rural localities in Ufimsky District